Maskineri (Machinery) is the fourth studio album by Norwegian alternative rock group Kaizers Orchestra, released on 18 February 2008. Recorded and mixed during November and December 2007, the album was released on the independent label Petroleum Records in Norway on 18 February 2008 and on Sony BMG in international territories on a later date.

Background 
The first new composition after the release of their third studio album, Maestro, was "Du og dine er even" (the song's title would later be changed to "Moment"), which was first played at a show at the famous Rockefeller Music Hall in Oslo, Norway. A day after the first performance, a private concert was held for fans who had won a contest held as a promotion for their 2006 live album Live at Vega. Here, not only did Kaizers Orchestra play some rarely played B-sides but "Du og dine er even" was performed again, and frontman Janove Ottesen also single-handedly performed a new composition, a pump-organ ballad called "Under månen". Around the same time, the band confirmed in an interview that the band was working on a song "about a dying man in a boat who, before he dies, tells the sea about his life". This has later been confirmed to be "Med en gong eg når bånn".

No new material surfaced until the band's Grand Finale Tour in autumn 2006, where two new songs, "Den sjette sansen" and "9 mm", were played, along with "Du og dine er even". Also, during the tour a fan managed to record parts of a soundcheck at the small concert venue Tobakken in Denmark, where they performed for the first time two untitled new songs, which were later confirmed to be "Enden av november" and "Du og meg Lou". The songs had been written earlier that day. After the last of the three concerts at Vega in Copenhagen, Denmark, the band officially announced that they would take a small sabbatical from acting as the collective group Kaizers Orchestra, so that all members could pursue their own projects until fall 2007. During this period, they negotiated their release from their contract with Universal Germany. They also played three live shows in 2007, despite the aforementioned announcement.

Janove Ottesen and Geir Zahl continued writing songs for Kaizers Orchestra throughout the end of 2006 and into 2007. A 30-track demo was recorded in early 2007.

Recording and production 
Early on, the band stated that with Maskineri they wanted to go in a new direction, not only with the songs, but also with how the album was to be made and whom to make it with. The band had recorded their three previous studio albums at Duper Studios in Bergen with the help of producer Jørgen Træen, whom they stated was the "best producer in the world." However, when they were approached by sound engineer and producer Mark Howard through MySpace, they came to an agreement, and Howard was hired as the producer for the new album. Howard had earlier mixed the audio for R.E.M. and Tom Waits, the latter of which had been a huge influence on the band's earlier work.

Many of the songs that had already been played live were completely disassembled and put together again, giving them a different sound and feel compared to the original versions of the songs performed in earlier times.

Writing and composition 
A new instrument that would be used by the band both in the album and at live shows was the marimba. The band's organ player, Helge Risa, had at one point said that for every new album, he wanted to learn to play a new instrument. He had previously learned how to play the electric piano for Evig pint and the accordion for Maestro.

The lyrics for all songs on the album are individual stories as opposed to interconnecting stories, a staple of a majority of most of their earlier work. Another noticeable difference from their earlier work is the absence of named characters in the lyrics (such as "Marcello" in Ompa til du dør and "Dieter Meyer" in Maestro), which was a staple of most Kaizers Orchestra compositions until that period.

Album name and art 
The album's title, Maskineri, which means "Machinery", was revealed in December 2007. The reason for choosing that is unknown, but in many news articles, the band has been referred to as an "extremely well-functional live act machinery". The track "Maskineri" also contains a sample loop from an actual machine, recorded by Tollak Friestad, better known as Don Fist from guitarist Terje Winterstø Røthing's punk-rock side project Skambankt.

The album art depicts the six members of Kaizers Orchestra—from left to right: Helge Risa, Geir Zahl, Janove Ottesen, Terje Winterstø Røthing, Rune Solheim and Øivind Storesund—standing in front of an old movie theater build in 3d by Gosu Design AS. The band's new logo is featured on top of the marquee, and the word "Maskineri" is on the marquee. On the cover, as well as all promotional photographs for the album, Helge Risa is shown without the band's trademark gas mask, emphasizing that Maskineri would be a very different album; the cover art for Maskineri marks the first time Helge has been featured on an album cover without the mask. However, the band's old logo featuring the gas mask is shown on a streetlight next to Risa. Inside the booklet there are several pictures from the Christiania Theatre in Oslo. The CD itself looks like an old-fashioned film roll.

Promotion and release 
On 17 December 2007 the first single, "Enden av november", was released on radio, their MySpace and iTunes. The same day, the first in a series of videos documenting the making of Maskineri was uploaded to YouTube. The first video included information about "Enden av november", and also featured the new version of "Du og dine er even" as background music. The second part, which was uploaded in January 2008, contained information about the track "Apokalyps meg". The third part of the series was released on 1 February and featured "9mm". P3TV, a Norwegian radio station, also released a clip of them playing an acoustic song believed to be the previously announced composition "Butikken opp å stå". That song was later released in 2010 as "Smil Far".

On 18 January 2008, the video for "Enden av november" was released on Sony BMG's webpage. On 21 January 2008, Kaizers.no (which was closed due to redesigns) was reopened. The first news post confirmed the final track listing for the album.

On 11 February 2008, the track "Apokalyps meg" was released as a free download from Kaizers.no, via the Norwegian Sony BMG website. On the following day the song "9mm" was premiered on Norwegian radio. On the morning of Friday 15 February, Janove Ottesen appeared on a radio show and premiered the 13th song on the Maskineri LP, "Romantisk salme i F-dur". The performance was recorded on video. On the same day, they uploaded the entire album for streaming on their MySpace.

On Monday 18 February, the album was put on shelves, although many had already received the album in the mail before the release date. The album was also released on iTunes Plus. The iTunes version also featured "Du og meg Lou" as opposed to the CD version. The same day, Kaizers held their first 2008 gig, for 100 fans who had won a contest for P3Sessions, a Norwegian radio arrangement. The concert was held in Loppen, a café in the Christiania district of Copenhagen, Denmark. The concert was broadcast on the radio. 980,000 tuned in to hear the show, which is a record for Norwegian radio.

On Tuesday 26 February, the final part of the Maskineri behind-the-scenes videos was uploaded to YouTube. In it, the band discussed the upcoming Maskineri tour and how they were going to perform the new songs from the album live.

Reception 

The album was received well by the three biggest newspapers in Norway, Aftenposten, VG and Dagbladet, which all gave the album a 5/6 score. Most music magazines and websites also followed up with good scores. However, Danish music magazine Gaffa gave the album 3/6, saying that the band "has lost their interest and belief in their own abilities". Kaizers Orchestra's official website featured an article on how the band feels about the reviewer's reactions to the album.

Since it was released on a Monday, Maskineri didn't enter the Norwegian Topp 40 Album charts until next week. The album made its debut on the charts in the coveted number-one spot.

Many fans were disconcerted when it was discovered that Helge Risa appears without his gas mask on the album cover and promotional images, dreading that it had been taken out from the live shows. Also, at their show at Loppen, Risa garnered neither the gas mask or had the traditional picture of Martin Luther and an old lamp on his pump organ. The removal of these items, which to many fans symbolize the essence of Kaizers Orchestra, was confirmed to be untrue, when a fan who had sent a mail to the band about it, received a reply that said that Risa was indisposed to bring them along for the trip. The absence of the mask in promotional images was because the band stated that they wanted to do something new with the promotional material.

On 20 June 2008, the album was confirmed to have reached the platinum mark, 30,000 sales. The band received a commemorative framed platinum disc at the Topp 20 Supershow in Oslo on the very same day.

Track listing 
Lyrics for all songs are in the Norwegian language, with some Swedish. Lyrics and music by Janove Ottesen, unless otherwise noted.

Compact disc version 
 "Moment" (Momentum) - 2:53
 "Apokalyps meg" (Apocalypse Me) - 4:26
 "Den andre er meg" (The Other One is Me) - 4:13
 "Bastard sønn" (Bastard Son) - 3:56
 "Maskineri" (Machinery) - 4:07
 "Toxic blod" (Toxic Blood) (Geir Zahl) - 2:57
 "9 mm" - 3:07
 "Volvo i Mexico" (Volvo in Mexico) (Zahl) - 3:15
 "Enden av november" (The End of November) - 4:20
 "Med en gong eg når bånn" (Once I Reach the Bottom) - 4:07
 "Kaizers 115. drøm" (Kaizer's 115th dream) (Ottesen/Zahl) - 3:14
 "Ond sirkel" (Vicious Cycle) (Zahl) - 2:24

iTunes Bonus Track
13. "Du og meg Lou" (You and Me, Lou) - 3:29

Vinyl version

Side one 
 "Moment" - 2:53
 "Apokalyps meg" - 4:26
 "Den andre er meg" - 4:13
 "Bastard sønn" - 3:56
 "Maskineri" - 4:07
 "Toxic blod" - 2:57
 "Ond sirkel" - 2:24

Side two 
 "9 mm" - 3:07
 "Volvo i Mexico" - 3:15
 "Enden av november" - 4:20
 "Med en gong eg når bånn" - 4:07
 "Kaizers 115. drøm" - 3:14
 "Romantisk salme i F-dur" (Romantic Psalm in F Major) (Ottesen) - 5:38

Scrapped tracks 
While mentioned during the recording process or otherwise played live, the songs below did not make it to the final listing.

 "Silkebånd" (Silk Ribbon)

Later Released 
 "Den sjette sansen" (The Sixth Sense) (Released on Våre demoner, in 2009)
 "Under månen" (Beneath the Moon) (Released on Våre demoner, in 2009)
 "Smil Far" (Smile Dad) (Released on the compilation album Hjertestups, in 2010)

Personnel 
 Janove Ottesen - vocals
 Geir Zahl - guitars
 Terje Winterstø Røthing – guitars
 Øyvind Storesund - double bass
 Helge Risa - keys, marimba
 Rune Solheim - drums
 Mark Howard - producer, mixing
 Ragnhild Winterstø Røthing - guest vocals
 Björn Myreze - Art Director & Photography

Guest musicians 
Gal Bar-Adon - Trombone
Mathieu Pé - Trumpet, flugelhorn
Florent Mannant - Tenor, Baritone saxophone
Andreas Pfaff - Strings

Notes and references 

Kaizers Orchestra albums
2008 albums